Karin Jacobs is a German physicist specializing in micro-fluidics and adhesion at micro- and nanometer scales. She is a professor at the Saarland University.

Life and career 
She then went on to study physics at the University of Konstanz, where she also received her doctorate in 1997. After completing her doctorate, Jacobs went on to perform postdoctoral research at the Max Planck Institute of Colloids and Interfaces. She subsequently became a research assistant in the Department of Applied Physics at the University of Ulm, after which she worked as a project manager at Bayer in their polymers division. In 2003, Jacobs became a professor at Saarland University. She became a fellow of the Leibniz Institute for New Materials in 2014. She is active in the Scientists for Future movement combating human-induced climate change.

Research 
Jacobs' research focuses on micro-fluidics, (bio-) adhesion at micro- and nano-scales, and functional materials.

Science Outreach 
In addition to her scientific research, Jacobs initiated a science outreach project, Lab in a Box. Through this initiative, students are introduced to fundamental concepts of physics through simple experiments that they can do at home or in the classroom.

Awards and memberships 
Jacobs is a member of the Akademie der Wissenschaften und der Literatur. In 1996, she was given the Byk Prize from Altana through their Herbert-Quandt-Stiftung. In the following year, she received the Schloeßmann Prize from the Max Planck Society. She gave the Beller Lecture, awarded to distinguished scientists from outside of the United States, of the American Physical Society in 2015. She has been a member of the German Council of Science and Humanities since 2016.

References 

21st-century German physicists
German women physicists
Year of birth missing (living people)
Living people
21st-century German women scientists